Joseph Warren Sheehy (October 21, 1910 – February 23, 1967) was a United States district judge of the United States District Court for the Eastern District of Texas.

Education and career

Born in Saratoga, Texas, Sheehy received a Bachelor of Laws from Baylor University School of Law in 1934. He was an assistant attorney general of the State of Texas from 1934 to 1935. He was in private practice in Tyler, Texas from 1935 to 1951, interrupted by his service in the United States Army Air Forces during World War II from 1942 to 1945, where he achieved the rank of Major.

Federal judicial service

On May 16, 1951, Sheehy was nominated by President Harry S. Truman to a seat on the United States District Court for the Eastern District of Texas vacated by Judge Randolph Bryant. Sheehy was confirmed by the United States Senate on June 7, 1951, and received his commission on June 8, 1951. He served as Chief Judge from 1954 until his death on February 23, 1967.

References

Sources
 

1910 births
1967 deaths
Baylor University alumni
Judges of the United States District Court for the Eastern District of Texas
United States district court judges appointed by Harry S. Truman
20th-century American judges
United States Army officers
20th-century American lawyers